S. K. Padmadevi (1924 – 19 September 2019) was an Indian actress in the Kannada and Tamil film industries.

Padmadevi started working in Kannada theatre in 1930 and remained active on stage till 1960. Later she was associated with All India Radio for two decades.

She participated in “Bhakta Sudhama” by Kalaivani. The song “Yadukulanandanane” she sang in “Bhakta Sudhama” became popular at that time.

Personal life
She was married to Padmanabha Rao, a theatre artist.

Filmography
 Sati Sulochana (1934)
 Bhakta Dhruva (1934)
 Samsara Nauka (1936)
 Gangavathar (1942)
 Malgudi Days (TV series) (1987)

Award
In 2016 she was awarded R. Nagendra Rao award instituted by the Karnataka Chalanachitra Academy.

References

External links

1924 births
2019 deaths
Indian film actresses
20th-century Indian actresses